Bangladesh Pharmaceutical Society is national professional society of pharmacists in Bangladesh. Mohammad Hassan Kawsar is the general secretary of the Bangladesh Pharmaceutical Society.

History
Bangladesh Pharmaceutical Society was established in 1972 to advance the interests of the profession and work to implement the National Health Programme. Bangladesh Pharmaceutical Journal is the official journal of the society. It is affiliated with international organizations International Pharmaceutical Federation and Commonwealth Pharmaceutical Association.

References

1972 establishments in Bangladesh
Organisations based in Dhaka
Pharmacy-related professional associations
Research institutes in Bangladesh
Learned societies of Bangladesh